Aminata Konaté may refer to:

Aminata Konaté (basketball) (born 1990), French basketball player
Aminata Konaté (sprinter) (born 1968), Guinean sprinter